is a Japanese manga series written by Yūto Tsukuda and illustrated by Shun Saeki. It was serialized in Shueisha's Weekly Shōnen Jump from November 2012 to June 2019. Its chapters were compiled in 36 tankōbon volumes published by Shueisha. The series follows an aspiring chef who enrolls in an elite culinary school where students take part in cooking competitions. Yuki Morisaki also works as a contributor, providing the recipes for the series. The manga is licensed by Viz Media in North America, who has been releasing the volumes digitally since March 2014, and released the first volume in print in August 2014. The manga series received sales of over 20 million.

An anime adaptation by J.C.Staff aired between April and September 2015. A second season, titled Food Wars! The Second Plate aired between July and September 2016. The first cour of the third season, titled Food Wars! The Third Plate, aired between October and December 2017. The second half aired between April and June 2018. A fourth season, titled Food Wars! The Fourth Plate, aired between October and December 2019. The fifth and final season, titled Food Wars! The Fifth Plate, aired between April and September 2020. The series has also had a pair of video games released in 2015. The series has received mixed reviews, with positive reactions to the narrative and genuine recipes depicted, whilst many critics panned the overuse of fan service.

Synopsis

Setting

The series is set mainly at Tōtsuki Culinary Academy (Tōtsuki Saryō Ryōri Gakuen), an elite culinary school located in Tokyo, Japan, where only a handful of students graduate from each year. Its students mostly come from Totsuki's junior high school, but transfers are taken provided that they pass the entrance exam. The campus is a wide-ranging resort with many research societies (clubs), cooking classrooms, and large arenas used for competitions. Housing varies, but the most affordable is the Polaris Dormitory, where students have to impress the dorm matron with a dish in order to secure residence. Tōtsuki also runs a chain of resort hotels, with the biggest being the Tōtsuki resort run by Gin Dojima, which is visited during Soma's first year at Tōtsuki.

The top student chefs occupy seats on the Council of Ten Masters, the highest governing body in the school aside from the school director. Students can initiate a shokugeki (anime: food war), a cook-off with stipulations on the line, with any other student or alumnus. Battles fought in this way could be for cooking utensils, research society facilities, council membership, or even expulsion from the school.

Plot
Teenager Soma Yukihira aspires to become a full-time chef in his father Joichiro's family restaurant, "Restaurant Yukihira", and to surpass his father's culinary skills. However, Joichiro gets a new job that requires him to travel around the world and close his shop. Joichiro has enrolled Soma in Tōtsuki Culinary Academy, an elite culinary school where students engage in cooking competitions called shokugeki. Soma secures himself a spot at the school, despite the objections of Erina Nakiri, the talented granddaughter of the school's dean. Soma is assigned to Polaris Dormitory where he meets other aspiring chefs, including Megumi Tadokoro. The story follows his adventures as he interacts with his peers and challenges Tōtsuki's students as well as others in shokugeki competitions. Learning that his father was not only a student of Tōtsuki, but also the second seat in the Council of Ten, Soma plans on becoming the best at the academy.

Soma and the other first-year students participate in a cooking camp judged by the school's alumni who expels about a third of the entering class. He enters the Fall Classic, a competition that takes the top 60 first-year students and pares them down to eight students who then compete in a single elimination tournament, The Autumn Elections. The first-years then participate in week-long stagiaire internships at local restaurants, as well as a large-scale school-wide Moon Festival. During the Moon Festival, Erina's father Azami takes over the school, and Soma and Erina form a rebel faction to challenge the establishment. The disgruntled members of the Council join the Rebel Faction and with support from Joichiro and Gin, the Rebels confront Azami's organization "Central" in a Regiment De Cuisine (Team Shokugeki). Eventually the Rebels emerge victorious and oust Azami with Erina as the new Headmaster.

Afterwards, Soma and the others enter into their second year. Several of the members in the Fall Classic have been promoted into the council, replacing the graduating third year batch. Their first assignment concerns about the existence of "dark chefs", those who work with criminal organizations and other VIPs. A particular organization, the "Les Cuisiniers Noirs", is led by Joichiro's former protege Asahi Saiba who defeated the former. Asahi infiltrates Totsuki, and abducts Erina from the Academy, with the intention to marry her. To recover Erina, the trio of Soma, Megumi and Takumi participate in an invitation-only cooking competition called BLUE, organized by the World Gourmet Organization under its Headmaster Mana Nakiri, Erina's mother. The trio encounter and fight against the Dark Chefs, with Soma eventually defeating Asahi. The manga ends with Soma and Erina facing each other in the final match of BLUE. Erina acknowledges Soma's cooking but insists on calling it "disgusting".

In the events of the epilogue ~Le dessert~, after the events of BLUE, Soma took an indefinite leave before taking the third year exams. During this time Erina and Hisako ask Joichiro about his past with Tamako, whereas Mana and Azami discover that Asahi is Azami's biological son and Erina's half-brother, leading the former to request him to join the Nakiri family. Many years after all Jewel Generation students graduation from Totsuki, Soma tells Erina that he's returning home and offers another challenge for her to which she gladly accepts, certain that he will make Erina finally say "delicious".

Conception and development 
Yuto Tsukuda has worked on two minor sports manga series,  Shōnen Shikku which was about soccer; and Ao no Rettou which was about ski jumping, the latter series he wrote while Food Wars was serialized. In an interview with Anime News Network, Tsukuda said that illustrator Shun Saeki "came up with the idea of a girl eating food, and she expresses herself about the food with 'ecstasy'," but since Saeki wanted to focus on drawing the manga, he needed someone to write a storyline so he got Tsukuda. Tsukuda said that he knew Saeki as a senpai from university. Celebrity chef Yuki Morisaki was brought in as a food consultant. Regarding the dynamics of the team, Tsukuda said that his "motivation throughout this whole project came from wanting to demonstrate the greatness of Saeki-sensei's art",  and for Saeki, he didn't think he had the storytelling power that Tsukuda had.

Tsukuda said that he and Saeki would collaborate on ideas for the storyline, and that later their editor would also be involved in the discussion. Some of the reactions to the dishes were the result of free association games, where they would pick some of the unexpected phrases. They keep a library of possible dishes that they researched before and every week they would see if any would fit their storyline.

Media

Manga

Food Wars!: Shokugeki no Soma is written by Yūto Tsukuda and illustrated by Shun Saeki. A one-shot was first published in Shueisha's Jump Next! in April 2012. The manga began its serialization in Weekly Shōnen Jump on November 26, 2012. The series finished in the magazine on June 17, 2019, while a three-chapter sequel titled Shokugeki no Soma -Le dessert- was published in Jump GIGA from June 27 to August 29, 2019. The first tankōbon volume was published on April 4, 2013. The thirty-sixth and last volume was published on October 4, 2019. Viz Media has licensed the manga for North America and published the first volume on August 5, 2014 and the last on June 2, 2020. Shueisha began to simulpublish the series in English on the website and app Manga Plus in January 2019.

An spin-off series, titled Shokugeki no Soma: L'étoile, ran in the Shōnen Jump+ website and app from February 20, 2015, to June 21, 2019. The individual chapters have been compiled into eight tankōbon volumes. A crossover story, titled Shokugeki no Sanji, was developed as a tribute to One Piece and has been published in Weekly Shōnen Jump since July 23, 2018. Two light novels, written by Michiko Itō, were also released, titled ~à la carte~ in 2014 and ~Fratelli Aldini~ in 2015.

Anime

An anime adaptation was announced in October 2014 by Shueisha. The anime was directed by Yoshitomo Yonetani at J.C.Staff with Shogo Yasukawa as the series scriptwriter and starred Yoshitsugu Matsuoka as the main character, Sōma Yukihira. Crunchyroll began streaming the anime on April 3, 2015. Sentai Filmworks licensed the anime for digital and home video release in North America. In Southeast Asia and South Asia, the series is licensed by Medialink. A 25-minute original video animation (OVA) was bundled with the 19th volume of the manga, which was released on July 4, 2016. It was later released on DVD releases alongside Black Clover and My Hero Academia bundled with the future volumes of their respective manga, as it was announced on Jump Special Anime Festa event. A second OVA was also released as a part of the first season.

A 13-episode second season, titled  aired from July 2 to September 24, 2016. A fourth OVA was released with the 25th manga on July 4, 2017. A third OVA was bundled with manga volume 24.

The first cour of the third season, titled Food Wars! Shokugeki no Soma: The Third Plate, aired from October 4 to December 20, 2017. A fifth OVA was released during the third series. The second half aired from  April 9 to June 25, 2018. In July 2019, Sentai Filmworks licensed season 3, which will be released on home video with an English dub in 2020. A fourth season entitled  aired from October 12 to December 28, 2019. The opening theme is "Chronos" by Stereo Dive Foundation, while the ending theme song is "Emblem" by Nano Ripe.

A fifth and last season entitled  aired from April 11 to September 26, 2020. The opening theme is "Last Chapter" by Nano Ripe, while the ending theme song is "Crossing Road" by Mai Fuchigami. On April 17, 2020, it was announced that after the second episode, the remaining episodes of season would be delayed until further notice due to the effects of the COVID-19 pandemic. In late May 2020, it was announced that weekly new episodes will resume on July 18 after Japanese TV stations reran the first two episodes on July 4 and July 11.

In the United States, the series premiered on Adult Swim's Toonami programming block on July 7, 2019.

Video games
Two games released in Japan were produced.  is a mobile game published by Bandai Namco Entertainment. The game was released for iOS and Android on August 17, 2015. 

 is a visual novel developed by FuRyu and published by Bandai Namco Entertainment. It was released for the Nintendo 3DS on December 17, 2015. A teaser trailer was revealed on May 24, 2015. The game features an original story that takes place in Europe while characters from the series interact among each other. In addition, the characters will be voiced by their respective voice actors from the anime. Gameplay requires little interaction from the player as most of the duration of the game is spent on reading the text that appears on the screen which represents either the dialogue between the various characters or the thoughts of the protagonist. Like many other visual novels, players will go through all kinds of situational events as the original story unfolds.

Reception

Critical response
Rebecca Silverman of Anime News Network gave the first volume of the manga series a B; praising the art and Soma as a likeable protagonist. However, she called the amount of fan service unnecessary and noted that it might make some readers uncomfortable. On the conclusion of the first series, Silverman commented "bumpy run with a slow start and some problems along the way". Ashley Hawkins writing for Manga Library called the manga a "insta-buy" due to its depictions of food and how the recipes are genuine. However, she was also put off by the amount of fan service present in both the manga and anime.

Cecilia D'Anastasio writing a piece on fan service for Kotaku also commented that they wouldn't watch the anime, saying it had a "distracting breast-to-food quotient". Russel Fernande, of One Tech Traveller gave the series a 4.7/5, calling it "addictive". It was number twelve on the 2014 Kono Manga ga Sugoi! Top 20 Manga for Male Readers survey, and it was number three in the Nationwide Bookstore Employees' Recommended Comics of 2014. Dan Barnett commented for the UK Anime Network that despite it having a "simplistic structure", the series was "utterly brilliant". However, Helen Knight, also writing for the UK Anime Network likened the series to the marmite slogan "either you love it or hate it".

Sales
Volume 1 has sold 139,657 copies as of April 28, 2013; volume 2 has sold 176,682 copies as of June 16, 2013; volume 3 has sold 238,590 copies as of August 18, 2013, volume 4 has sold 252,975 copies, as of September 22, 2013; volume 5 has sold 271,570 copies as of December 22, 2013; volume 6 has sold 277,726 copies as of February 23, 2014; and volume 7 has sold 279,364 copies as of April 20, 2014. As of May 2, 2018, it was revealed that the manga had 14 million copies in print. By June 17, 2019, the manga had 19 million copies in print. As of March 2020, manga sales reached 20 million.

See also
 Cooking Papa (1985 debut), a cooking manga and anime series
 Chūka Ichiban! (1995 debut), a cooking manga and anime series
 The God of Cookery (1996), a Stephen Chow cooking film
 Oishinbo (1983 debut), a cooking manga and anime series
 Yakitate!! Japan (2001 debut), a cooking manga and anime series

Explanatory notes

References

External links
  
  
 

2012 manga
2015 anime television series debuts
Animeism
Bandai Namco franchises
Comedy anime and manga
Cooking in anime and manga
Crunchyroll anime
J.C.Staff
Mainichi Broadcasting System original programming
Medialink
School life in anime and manga
Sentai Filmworks
Shōnen manga
Shueisha franchises
Shueisha manga
Slice of life anime and manga
TBS Television (Japan) original programming
Toonami
Viz Media manga